U.S. Route 1 (US 1) in the U.S. state of Connecticut is a major east–west U.S. Route along Long Island Sound. It has been replaced by Interstate 95 (I-95) as a through route, which it closely parallels, and now primarily serves as a local business route. Despite its largely east–west orientation, it is part of a north–south route and is mostly signed north–south.

Most of US 1 through Connecticut encompasses its predecessor, the Boston Post Road, and, in many towns, it is still named Boston Post Road (or Post Road).

Route description

US 1 in Connecticut largely parallels I-95 and has many interchanges with it. The route passes through each city and town of Connecticut bordering the Long Island Sound (in addition to the town of Orange). 

From Greenwich to Branford, US 1 is mostly a four- or six-lane principal arterial road (with some two-lane sections in dense areas). From Branford to Stonington, US 1 it a two- or four-lane minor arterial road.

US 1 is known as Boston Post Road or Post Road for the majority of its length, but it also encompasses other local street names. The route is known as Putnam Avenue in Greenwich; Tresser Boulevard, West Main Street, and East Main Street in Stamford; Connecticut Avenue in parts of Norwalk; Boston Avenue in parts of Bridgeport; and New London Road in parts of Groton. In Stonington, the route is known as Stonington Road, South Broad Street, and West Broad Street. US 1 is also known as Main Street in Branford and Clinton.

Overlap with I-95
US 1 is concurrent with I-95 in two sections, both of which are river crossings. The western concurrency is between exits 68 and 70 from Old Saybrook to Old Lyme, where the two routes cross the Connecticut River via the Raymond E. Baldwin Bridge. The eastern concurrency is between exits 83 and 85 from New London to Groton, where the routes cross the Thames River via the Gold Star Memorial Bridge.

US 1's two other major bridge crossings closely parallel the I-95 crossings of those rivers. The Washington Bridge over the Housatonic River, connecting Milford and Stratford, as well as the Tomlinson Lift Bridge over the Quinnipiac River in New Haven, is a short distance away from I-95's Moses Wheeler and Pearl Harbor Memorial bridges, respectively.

US 1 also forms a frontage road for I-95 in parts of Fairfield, Stratford, and New London.

History

US 1 generally follows the old Boston Post Road and turnpike roads built to replace it. Specifically, the Greenwich Road, chartered in 1792, was the part in Greenwich and became part of the longer New York-to-Fairfield Connecticut Turnpike (not to be confused with the contemporary Connecticut Turnpike) in 1806. The New Haven and Milford Turnpike (1802) continued from Milford to New Haven, and the New London and Lyme Turnpike (1807) connected Old Lyme with New London.

Route 51

US 1 was originally built where it currently exists in Old Lyme and East Lyme. However, from 1949 to 1976, US 1 existed where I-95 currently exists in Old Lyme and East Lyme. From 1962 to 1976, this stretch of road was Route 51, which traveled for  through Old Lyme and East Lyme and was known as the Boston Post Road. In 1976, US 1 returned to the  stretch of road, thus eliminating the need for Route 51.

Major intersections

References

External links

US 1 (Greater New York Roads)

01
 1 Connecticut
Transportation in Fairfield County, Connecticut
Transportation in New Haven County, Connecticut
Transportation in New Haven, Connecticut
Transportation in Middlesex County, Connecticut
Transportation in New London County, Connecticut